The 1996 Detroit Tigers had a record of 53–109 for what was, at the time, the most losses (109) and worst winning percentage (.327) in team history—both of which since been surpassed twice by the 2003 and 2019 teams.

With a number of capable batters (Cecil Fielder, Tony Clark, Bobby Higginson, Alan Trammell, Rubén Sierra, and Damion Easley), the team scored a respectable 783 runs.  However, the 1996 Tigers lacked pitching, allowing their opponents to score 1,103 runs and posting a team ERA of 6.38.  No team in American League history and only one in major league history (the 1930 Philadelphia Phillies) has given up more runs.  No pitcher on the team had more than 7 wins. Of the 109 games the Tigers lost, 58 were by four or more runs, a record for the number of games lost by such a margin. The Tigers made more unwanted history when they were swept 12–0 by the Cleveland Indians in the regular season series, losing all twelve games played while being outscored, 79–28. The 1996 Tigers did not have a winning record against any AL opponent.

Regular season

Opening Day roster
Chad Curtis CF  
Bobby Higginson RF  
Travis Fryman 3B  
Cecil Fielder 1B 
Melvin Nieves LF 
Eddie Williams DH
Mark Lewis 2B   
John Flaherty C  
Alan Trammell SS  
Felipe Lira SP

Season standings

Record vs. opponents

Game log

|- bgcolor="ffbbbb"
| 1 || April 1 || @ Twins || 6–8 || Radke || Lira (0–1) || Stevens || 30,185 || 0–1
|- bgcolor="ccffcc"
| 2 || April 2 || @ Twins || 10–6 || Sodowsky (1–0) || Robertson || — || 20,164 || 1–1
|- bgcolor="ffbbbb"
| 3 || April 3 || @ Twins || 7–16 || Mahomes || Aldred (0–1) || — || 12,256 || 1–2
|- bgcolor="ccffcc"
| 4 || April 4 || @ Athletics || 10–9 (15) || Keagle (1–0) || Small || — || 8,346 || 2–2
|- bgcolor="ffbbbb"
| 5 || April 5 || @ Athletics || 2–13 || Johns || Gohr (0–1) || — || 11,149 || 2–3
|- bgcolor="ccffcc"
| 6 || April 6 || @ Athletics || 6–1 || Lira (1–1) || Reyes || — || 10,424 || 3–3
|- bgcolor="ffbbbb"
| 7 || April 7 || @ Athletics || 6–7 || Corsi || Williams (0–1) || — || 9,723 || 3–4
|- bgcolor="ccffcc"
| 8 || April 9 || Mariners || 10–9 || Keagle (2–0) || Menhart || Williams (1) || 42,932 || 4–4
|- bgcolor="ccffcc"
| 9 || April 10 || Mariners || 7–3 || Olivares (1–0) || Hurtado || — || 9,299 || 5–4
|- bgcolor="ffbbbb"
| 10 || April 11 || Mariners || 1–9 || Johnson || Gohr (0–2) || — || 12,272 || 5–5
|- bgcolor="ffbbbb"
| 11 || April 12 || Angels || 4–5 || Finley || Lira (1–2) || Percival || 9,921 || 5–6
|- bgcolor="ccffcc"
| 12 || April 13 || Angels || 9–5 || Keagle (3–0) || Sanderson || — || 11,719 || 6–6
|- bgcolor="ccffcc"
| 13 || April 14 || Angels || 5–4 || Lewis (1–0) || James || — || 12,009 || 7–6
|- bgcolor="ffbbbb"
| 14 || April 15 || @ Blue Jays || 2–8 || Guzman || Olivares (1–1) || — || 26,127 || 7–7
|- bgcolor="ccffcc"
| 15 || April 16 || @ Blue Jays || 13–8 || Gohr (1–2) || Hanson || Lewis (1) || 25,503 || 8–7
|- bgcolor="ffbbbb"
| 16 || April 17 || @ Mariners || 3–8 || Jackson || Veres (0–1) || — || 18,008 || 8–8
|- bgcolor="ffbbbb"
| 17 || April 18 || @ Mariners || 3–11 || Bosio || Sodowsky (1–1) || Hurtado || 17,536 || 8–9
|- bgcolor="ffbbbb"
| 18 || April 19 || @ Angels || 3–4 || Langston || Myers (0–1) || — || 32,693 || 8–10
|- bgcolor="ffbbbb"
| 19 || April 20 || @ Angels || 1–2 || Grimsley || Keagle (3–1) || Percival || 25,685 || 8–11
|- bgcolor="ffbbbb"
| 20 || April 21 || @ Angels || 5–6 || Eichhorn || Lewis (1–1) || Percival || 36,733 || 8–12
|- bgcolor="ffbbbb"
| 21 || April 22 || @ Angels || 5–6 || James || Christopher (0–1) || Percival || 17,039 || 8–13
|- bgcolor="ffbbbb"
| 22 || April 24 || Twins || 11–24 || Bennett || Veres (0–2) || — || 12,189 || 8–14
|- bgcolor="ffbbbb"
| 23 || April 25 || Twins || 1–11 || Hawkins || Aldred (0–2) || Hansell || 11,804 || 8–15
|- bgcolor="ccffcc"
| 24 || April 26 || Athletics || 14–5 || Christopher (1–1) || Johns || — || 7,941 || 9–15
|- bgcolor="ffbbbb"
| 25 || April 27 || Athletics || 1–4 || Reyes || Lira (1–3) || Taylor || 13,067 || 9–16
|- bgcolor="ffbbbb"
| 26 || April 28 || Athletics || 3–6 || Wojciechowski || Gohr (1–3) || Taylor || 8,907 || 9–17
|- bgcolor="ffbbbb"
| 27 || April 30 || @ Red Sox || 4–13 || Wakefield || Lima (0–1) || — || 18,504 || 9–18
|-

|- bgcolor="ffbbbb"
| 28 || May 1 || @ Red Sox || 1–5 || Clemens || Aldred (0–3) || — || 20,828 || 9–19
|- bgcolor="ccffcc"
| 29 || May 2 || Rangers || 5–2 || Lira (2–3) || Witt || Williams (2) || 7,416 || 10–19
|- bgcolor="ffbbbb"
| 30 || May 3 || Rangers || 0–11 || Hill || Keagle (3–2) || — || 9,079 || 10–20
|- bgcolor="ffbbbb"
| 31 || May 4 || Rangers || 1–3 || Pavlik || Gohr (1–4) || — || 10,734 || 10–21
|- bgcolor="ffbbbb"
| 32 || May 5 || Rangers || 2–3 || Gross || Lima (0–2) || Henneman || 12,337 || 10–22
|- bgcolor="ffbbbb"
| 33 || May 6 || @ Yankees || 5–10 || Wickman || Myers (0–2) || — || 12,838 || 10–23
|- bgcolor="ffbbbb"
| 34 || May 7 || @ Yankees || 5–12 || Mecir || Lewis (1–2) || Nelson || 12,760 || 10–24
|- bgcolor="ffbbbb"
| 35 || May 8 || @ Yankees || 3–10 || Gooden || Keagle (3–3) || — || 18,729 || 10–25
|- bgcolor="ccffcc"
| 36 || May 9 || @ Yankees || 4–2 || Gohr (2–4) || Key || Myers (1) || 13,098 || 11–25
|- bgcolor="ffbbbb"
| 37 || May 10 || @ Rangers || 2–6 || Pavlik || Lima (0–3) || Henneman || 31,426 || 11–26
|- bgcolor="ffbbbb"
| 38 || May 11 || @ Rangers || 7–11 || Gross || Aldred (0–4) || — || 42,732 || 11–27
|- bgcolor="ccffcc"
| 39 || May 12 || @ Rangers || 5–3 || Lira (3–3) || Oliver || Myers (2) || 35,677 || 12–27
|- bgcolor="ffbbbb"
| 40 || May 14 || @ Indians || 1–5 || Nagy || Gohr (2–5) || — || 40,765 || 12–28
|- bgcolor="ffbbbb"
| 41 || May 15 || @ Indians || 2–5 || Martinez || Lima (0–4) || Mesa || 42,259 || 12–29
|- bgcolor="ffbbbb"
| 42 || May 16 || @ Indians || 3–8 || McDowell || Williams (0–2) || — || 42,330 || 12–30
|- bgcolor="ffbbbb"
| 43 || May 17 || White Sox || 6–11 (10) || Hernandez || Lewis (1–3) || — || 12,094 || 12–31
|- bgcolor="ffbbbb"
| 44 || May 18 || White Sox || 4–16 || McCaskill || Farrell (0–1) || Simas || 21,673 || 12–32
|- bgcolor="ffbbbb"
| 45 || May 19 || White Sox || 3–14 || Alvarez || Gohr (2–6) || — || 9,709 || 12–33
|- bgcolor="ffbbbb"
| 46 || May 21 || Royals || 1–7 || Linton || Williams (0–3) || Valera || 24,372 || 12–34
|- bgcolor="ffbbbb"
| 47 || May 22 || Royals || 4–6 || Belcher || Farrell (0–2) || Montgomery || 12,890 || 12–35
|- bgcolor="ffbbbb"
| 48 || May 24 || Indians || 3–6 || Plunk || Veres (0–3) || Mesa || 26,967 || 12–36
|- bgcolor="ffbbbb"
| 49 || May 25 || Indians || 6–7 || Nagy || Lewis (1–4) || Mesa || 41,527 || 12–37
|- bgcolor="ffbbbb"
| 50 || May 26 || Indians || 0–5 || Martinez || Williams (0–4) || — || 39,056 || 12–38
|- bgcolor="ffbbbb"
| 51 || May 27 || @ Royals || 4–5 (13) || Montgomery || Veres (0–4) || — || 19,776 || 12–39
|- bgcolor="ccffcc"
| 52 || May 29 || @ Royals || 5–4 || Gohr (3–6) || Appier || Walker (1) || 13,712 || 13–39
|- bgcolor="ffbbbb"
| 53 || May 30 || @ White Sox || 2–8 || Alvarez || Olivares (1–2) || — || 17,339 || 13–40
|- bgcolor="ffbbbb"
| 54 || May 31 || @ White Sox || 0–9 || Tapani || Lira (3–4) || — || 16,983 || 13–41
|-

|- bgcolor="ffbbbb"
| 55 || June 2 || @ White Sox || 2–4 || Baldwin || Thompson (0–1) || Hernandez || — || 13–42
|- bgcolor="ffbbbb"
| 56 || June 2 || @ White Sox || 5–13 || McCaskill || Keagle (3–4) || — || 26,125 || 13–43
|- bgcolor="ffbbbb"
| 57 || June 4 || @ Orioles || 7–10 || Mussina || Gohr (3–7) || Myers || 43,727 || 13–44
|- bgcolor="ffbbbb"
| 58 || June 5 || @ Orioles || 4–6 || Rhodes || Myers (0–3) || Myers || 43,087 || 13–45
|- bgcolor="ffbbbb"
| 59 || June 6 || @ Orioles || 6–13 || Krivda || Lira (3–5) || — || 46,269 || 13–46
|- bgcolor="ccffcc"
| 60 || June 7 || Yankees || 6–5 || Lewis (2–4) || Nelson || — || 16,350 || 14–46
|- bgcolor="ccffcc"
| 61 || June 8 || Yankees || 9–7 || Olson (1–0) || Rogers || Lewis (2) || 20,173 || 15–46
|- bgcolor="ffbbbb"
| 62 || June 9 || Yankees || 2–3 || Gooden || Gohr (3–8) || Wetteland || 16,588 || 15–47
|- bgcolor="ccffcc"
| 63 || June 10 || Orioles || 8–3 || Olivares (2–2) || Wells || — || 10,655 || 16–47
|- bgcolor="ffbbbb"
| 64 || June 11 || Orioles || 9–12 || Coppinger || Lira (3–6) || — || 10,874 || 16–48
|- bgcolor="ffbbbb"
| 65 || June 12 || Orioles || 7–10 || Rhodes || Lewis (2–5) || Myers || 12,043 || 16–49
|- bgcolor="ccffcc"
| 66 || June 14 || @ Twins || 5–4 || Gohr (4–8) || Robertson || Olson (1) || 22,831 || 17–49
|- bgcolor="ccffcc"
| 67 || June 15 || @ Twins || 6–4 || Olivares (3–2) || Rodriguez || Olson (2) || 17,099 || 18–49
|- bgcolor="ffbbbb"
| 68 || June 16 || @ Twins || 1–4 || Aguilera || Lira (3–7) || Hansell || 20,641 || 18–50
|- bgcolor="ffbbbb"
| 69 || June 17 || Athletics || 4–8 (10) || Corsi || Myers (0–4) || — || 9,231 || 18–51
|- bgcolor="ffbbbb"
| 70 || June 18 || Athletics || 5–8 || Van Poppel || Urbani (0–1) || Taylor || 8,543 || 18–52
|- bgcolor="ffbbbb"
| 71 || June 19 || Athletics || 3–10 || Wasdin || Keagle (3–5) || — || 9,875 || 18–53
|- bgcolor="ffbbbb"
| 72 || June 20 || Twins || 3–7 || Rodriguez || Olivares (3–3) || — || 8,310 || 18–54
|- bgcolor="ccffcc"
| 73 || June 21 || Twins || 2–0 || Lira (4–7) || Aguilera || — || 13,127 || 19–54
|- bgcolor="ccffcc"
| 74 || June 22 || Twins || 6–0 || Williams (1–4) || Aldred || — || 14,506 || 20–54
|- bgcolor="ccffcc"
| 75 || June 23 || Twins || 10–8 || Urbani (1–1) || Radke || — || 13,994 || 21–54
|- bgcolor="ffbbbb"
| 76 || June 24 || @ Athletics || 2–4 || Wasdin || Sodowsky (1–2) || Taylor || 10,122 || 21–55
|- bgcolor="ccffcc"
| 77 || June 25 || @ Athletics || 10–8 || Olivares (4–3) || Wengert || Olson (3) || 9,652 || 22–55
|- bgcolor="ccffcc"
| 78 || June 27 || @ Red Sox || 9–6 || Lira (5–7) || Minchey || — || 29,582 || 23–55
|- bgcolor="ffbbbb"
| 79 || June 28 || @ Red Sox || 5–8 || Wakefield || Williams (1–5) || — || 27,578 || 23–56
|- bgcolor="ffbbbb"
| 80 || June 29 || @ Red Sox || 6–13 || Eshelman || Keagle (3–6) || — || 33,509 || 23–57
|- bgcolor="ffbbbb"
| 81 || June 30 || @ Red Sox || 4–9 || Gordon || Sodowsky (1–3) || — || 31,217 || 23–58
|-

|- bgcolor="ffbbbb"
| 82 || July 1 || Brewers || 0–2 || Sparks || Olivares (4–4) || Fetters || 10,727 || 23–59
|- bgcolor="ffbbbb"
| 83 || July 2 || Brewers || 1–2 (11) || Garcia || Sager (0–1) || Fetters || 9,455 || 23–60
|- bgcolor="ccffcc"
| 84 || July 3 || Brewers || 8–5 || Williams (2–5) || D'Amico || — || 11,047 || 24–60
|- bgcolor="ccffcc"
| 85 || July 4 || Blue Jays || 6–1 || Nitkowski (1–0) || Janzen || Myers (6) || 10,557 || 25–60
|- bgcolor="ccffcc"
| 86 || July 5 || Blue Jays || 4–3 || Sager (1–1) || Hanson || Olson (4) || 20,808 || 26–60
|- bgcolor="ffbbbb"
| 87 || July 6 || Blue Jays || 0–15 || Hentgen || Olivares (4–5) || — || 16,228 || 26–61
|- bgcolor="ccffcc"
| 88 || July 7 || Blue Jays || 9–0 || Lira (6–7) || Ware || — || 15,784 || 27–61
|- bgcolor="ffbbbb"
| 89 || July 11 || Red Sox || 4–11 || Clemens || Williams (2–6) || — || 15,826 || 27–62
|- bgcolor="ffbbbb"
| 90 || July 12 || Red Sox || 3–11 || Gordon || Olivares (4–6) || — || 19,535 || 27–63
|- bgcolor="ffbbbb"
| 91 || July 13 || Red Sox || 5–10 || Sele || Nitkowski (1–1) || — || 16,671 || 27–64
|- bgcolor="ffbbbb"
| 92 || July 14 || Red Sox || 4–6 || Moyer || Lira (6–8) || Slocumb || 19,670 || 27–65
|- bgcolor="ccffcc"
| 93 || July 15 || @ Brewers || 10–9 || Sager (2–1) || Bones || Olson (5) || 15,819 || 28–65
|- bgcolor="ffbbbb"
| 94 || July 16 || @ Brewers || 7–20 || D'Amico || Williams (2–7) || — || 12,476 || 28–66
|- bgcolor="ffbbbb"
| 95 || July 17 || @ Brewers || 2–3 (10) || Fetters || Urbani (1–2) || — || 21,121 || 28–67
|- bgcolor="ffbbbb"
| 96 || July 18 || @ Blue Jays || 4–8 || Hentgen || Nitkowski (1–2) || — || 31,202 || 28–68
|- bgcolor="ccffcc"
| 97 || July 19 || @ Blue Jays || 8–6 || Urbani (2–2) || Janzen || Olson (6) || 30,123 || 29–68
|- bgcolor="ccffcc"
| 98 || July 20 || @ Blue Jays || 5–4 (10) || Olson (2–0) || Quantrill || Lima (1) || 36,220 || 30–68
|- bgcolor="ffbbbb"
| 99 || July 21 || @ Blue Jays || 4–5 (12) || Spoljaric || Lima (0–5) || — || 33,238 || 30–69
|- bgcolor="ffbbbb"
| 100 || July 22 || @ Angels || 0–1 || Finley || Olivares (4–7) || Percival || 16,336 || 30–70
|- bgcolor="ccffcc"
| 101 || July 23 || @ Angels || 8–3 || Lima (1–5) || James || — || 16,432 || 31–70
|- bgcolor="ccffcc"
| 102 || July 25 || @ Mariners || 7–4 (10) || Lima (2–5) || Ayala || — || 19,949 || 32–70
|- bgcolor="ffbbbb"
| 103 || July 26 || @ Mariners || 4–6 || Hitchcock || Sager (2–2) || Jackson || 25,175 || 32–71
|- bgcolor="ffbbbb"
| 104 || July 27 || @ Mariners || 7–13 || Davis || Williams (2–8) || — || 43,209 || 32–72
|- bgcolor="ccffcc"
| 105 || July 28 || @ Mariners || 14–6 || Olivares (5–7) || Bosio || — || 38,204 || 33–72
|- bgcolor="ccffcc"
| 106 || July 30 || Angels || 12–9 || Nitkowski (2–2) || Grimsley || — || 11,641 || 34–72
|- bgcolor="ccffcc"
| 107 || July 31 || Angels || 10–5 || Lima (3–5) || Holtz || — || 9,740 || 35–72
|-

|- bgcolor="ccffcc"
| 108 || August 1 || Angels || 13–5 || Williams (3–8) || Boskie || — || 14,591 || 36–72
|- bgcolor="ccffcc"
| 109 || August 2 || Mariners || 8–2 || Olivares (6–7) || Wagner || — || 23,405 || 37–72
|- bgcolor="ccffcc"
| 110 || August 3 || Mariners || 6–3 || Olson (3–0) || Charlton || — || 25,928 || 38–72
|- bgcolor="ffbbbb"
| 111 || August 4 || Mariners || 3–9 || Wolcott || Nitkowski (2–3) || — || 23,569 || 38–73
|- bgcolor="ffbbbb"
| 112 || August 6 || Rangers || 2–4 || Hill || Lira (6–9) || Henneman || 10,931 || 38–74
|- bgcolor="ccffcc"
| 113 || August 7 || Rangers || 4–2 || Cummings (1–0) || Pavlik || Myers (7) || 10,297 || 39–74
|- bgcolor="ccffcc"
| 114 || August 8 || Rangers || 3–2 || Olivares (7–7) || Heredia || — || 10,995 || 40–74
|- bgcolor="ccffcc"
| 115 || August 9 || @ Yankees || 5–3 || Cummings (2–0) || Pettitte || Myers (8) || 23,439 || 41–74
|- bgcolor="ccffcc"
| 116 || August 10 || @ Yankees || 13–7 || Lewis (3–5) || Key || — || 28,863 || 42–74
|- bgcolor="ffbbbb"
| 117 || August 11 || @ Yankees || 0–12 || Rogers || Lira (6–10) || — || 33,517 || 42–75
|- bgcolor="ffbbbb"
| 118 || August 12 || @ Rangers || 0–7 || Hill || Williams (3–9) || — || 25,210 || 42–76
|- bgcolor="ffbbbb"
| 119 || August 13 || @ Rangers || 2–6 || Pavlik || Olivares (7–8) || — || 31,331 || 42–77
|- bgcolor="ffbbbb"
| 120 || August 14 || @ Rangers || 4–5 || Witt || Van Poppel (0–1) || Henneman || 33,942 || 42–78
|- bgcolor="ffbbbb"
| 121 || August 16 || @ Indians || 1–3 (12) || Assenmacher || Lewis (3–6) || — || 42,485 || 42–79
|- bgcolor="ffbbbb"
| 122 || August 17 || @ Indians || 3–6 || Hershiser || Thompson (0–2) || Mesa || 42,511 || 42–80
|- bgcolor="ffbbbb"
| 123 || August 18 || @ Indians || 3–11 || Ogea || Williams (3–10) || — || 42,337 || 42–81
|- bgcolor="ffbbbb"
| 124 || August 19 || White Sox || 7–12 || Simas || Lima (3–6) || — || 14,690 || 42–82
|- bgcolor="ccffcc"
| 125 || August 20 || White Sox || 16–11 || Lewis (4–6) || Tapani || — || 12,119 || 43–82
|- bgcolor="ccffcc"
| 126 || August 21 || White Sox || 7–4 || Lima (4–6) || Simas || Olson (7) || 13,424 || 44–82
|- bgcolor="ccffcc"
| 127 || August 22 || @ Royals || 10–3 || Thompson (1–2) || Belcher || — || 14,699 || 45–82
|- bgcolor="ccffcc"
| 128 || August 23 || @ Royals || 3–2 || Sager (3–2) || Appier || Olson (8) || 15,603 || 46–82
|- bgcolor="ffbbbb"
| 129 || August 24 || @ Royals || 2–9 || Rosado || Olivares (7–9) || — || 28,011 || 46–83
|- bgcolor="ccffcc"
| 130 || August 25 || @ Royals || 7–4 || Van Poppel (1–1) || Linton || Myers (9) || 15,123 || 47–83
|- bgcolor="ffbbbb"
| 131 || August 26 || Indians || 1–2 || Nagy || Lira (6–11) || — || 22,349 || 47–84
|- bgcolor="ffbbbb"
| 132 || August 27 || Indians || 2–12 || Lopez || Thompson (1–3) || — || 19,602 || 47–85
|- bgcolor="ffbbbb"
| 133 || August 28 || Indians || 3–9 || Hershiser || Sager (3–3) || — || 21,091 || 47–86
|- bgcolor="ccffcc"
| 134 || August 29 || Royals || 4–1 || Eischen (1–0) || Appier || Lima (2) || 7,882 || 48–86
|- bgcolor="ccffcc"
| 135 || August 30 || Royals || 4–0 || Van Poppel (2–1) || Rosado || — || 16,498 || 49–86
|- bgcolor="ffbbbb"
| 136 || August 31 || Royals || 1–3 || Linton || Lira (6–12) || Montgomery || 16,270 || 49–87
|-

|- bgcolor="ffbbbb"
| 137 || September 1 || Royals || 2–3 (13) || Huisman || Myers (0–5) || Jacome || 17,647 || 49–88
|- bgcolor="ccffcc"
| 138 || September 2 || @ White Sox || 8–6 || Myers (1–5) || Hernandez || Lima (3) || 19,599 || 50–88
|- bgcolor="ffbbbb"
| 139 || September 3 || @ White Sox || 4–6 || Bertotti || Olivares (7–10) || Hernandez || 13,857 || 50–89
|- bgcolor="ffbbbb"
| 140 || September 4 || @ White Sox || 6–11 || Castillo || Miller (0–1) || — || 15,120 || 50–90
|- bgcolor="ccffcc"
| 141 || September 6 || @ Orioles || 5–4 (12) || Cummings (3–0) || Mathews || — || 46,708 || 51–90
|- bgcolor="ffbbbb"
| 142 || September 7 || @ Orioles || 0–6 || Mussina || Thompson (1–4) || — || 47,131 || 51–91
|- bgcolor="ffbbbb"
| 143 || September 8 || @ Orioles || 2–6 || Mills || Eischen (1–1) || — || 47,082 || 51–92
|- bgcolor="ffbbbb"
| 144 || September 9 || @ Orioles || 4–5 || Erickson || Olivares (7–11) || Myers || 42,562 || 51–93
|- bgcolor="ffbbbb"
| 145 || September 10 || Yankees || 8–9 || Rivera || Sager (3–4) || Wetteland || 11,042 || 51–94
|- bgcolor="ffbbbb"
| 146 || September 11 || Yankees || 3–7 || Key || Lira (6–13) || — || 9,775 || 51–95
|- bgcolor="ffbbbb"
| 147 || September 12 || Yankees || 3–12 || Cone || Thompson (1–5) || — || 9,009 || 51–96
|- bgcolor="ffbbbb"
| 148 || September 13 || Orioles || 4–7 || Erickson || Miller (0–2) || Mills || 11,178 || 51–97
|- bgcolor="ffbbbb"
| 149 || September 14 || Orioles || 6–7 || Mathews || Cummings (3–1) || Myers || 15,386 || 51–98
|- bgcolor="ffbbbb"
| 150 || September 15 || Orioles || 6–16 || Corbin || Van Poppel (2–2) || — || 13,764 || 51–99
|- bgcolor="ffbbbb"
| 151 || September 17 || Red Sox || 2–4 || Brandenburg || Lira (6–14) || Slocumb || 8,180 || 51–100
|- bgcolor="ffbbbb"
| 152 || September 18 || Red Sox || 0–4 || Clemens || Thompson (1–6) || — || 8,779 || 51–101
|- bgcolor="ffbbbb"
| 153 || September 19 || Red Sox || 3–8 || Gordon || Miller (0–3) || — || 7,666 || 51–102
|- bgcolor="ccffcc"
| 154 || September 20 || @ Brewers || 10–1 || Sager (4–4) || Karl || — || 15,046 || 52–102
|- bgcolor="ffbbbb"
| 155 || September 21 || @ Brewers || 6–13 || D'Amico || Van Poppel (2–3) || Villone || 33,106 || 52–103
|- bgcolor="ccffcc"
| 156 || September 22 || @ Brewers || 7–5 || Lima (5–6) || Fetters || — || 15,705 || 53–103
|- bgcolor="ffbbbb"
| 157 || September 23 || Blue Jays || 4–6 || Hanson || Sager (4–5) || Timlin || 9,678 || 53–104
|- bgcolor="ffbbbb"
| 158 || September 24 || Blue Jays || 1–4 || Hentgen || Miller (0–4) || Timlin || 8,355 || 53–105
|- bgcolor="ffbbbb"
| 159 || September 25 || Blue Jays || 11–13 || Brow || Cummings (3–2) || Timlin || 8,055 || 53–106
|- bgcolor="ffbbbb"
| 160 || September 27 || Brewers || 6–7 (6) || Wickman || Van Poppel (2–4) || — || 8,606 || 53–107
|- bgcolor="ffbbbb"
| 161 || September 28 || Brewers || 2–7 || Eldred || Moehler (0–1) || — || 12,939 || 53–108
|- bgcolor="ffbbbb"
| 162 || September 29 || Brewers || 5–7 (10) || Reyes || Cummings (3–3) || Fetters || 13,038 || 53–109
|-

|-
| Legend:       = Win       = LossBold = Tigers team member

Detailed records

Notable transactions
March 22, 1996: Melvin Nieves was traded by the San Diego Padres with Raul Casanova and Richie Lewis to the Detroit Tigers for Sean Bergman, Todd Steverson, and Cade Gaspar (minors).
March 31, 1996: Curtis Pride was signed as a free agent with the Detroit Tigers.
April 27, 1996: Joe Boever was selected off waivers by the Pittsburgh Pirates from the Detroit Tigers.
July 31, 1996: Cecil Fielder was traded by the Detroit Tigers to the New York Yankees for Rubén Sierra and Matt Drews (minors).
July 31, 1996: Chad Curtis was traded by the Detroit Tigers to the Los Angeles Dodgers for John Cummings and Joey Eischen.
 August 6, 1996: Todd Van Poppel was selected off waivers by the Detroit Tigers from the Oakland Athletics.

Roster

Player stats

Batting

Starters by position
Note: Pos = Position; G = Games played; AB = At bats; H = Hits; Avg. = Batting average; HR = Home runs; RBI = Runs batted in

Other batters
Note: G = Games played; AB = At bats; H = Hits; Avg. = Batting average; HR = Home runs; RBI = Runs batted in

Pitching

Starting pitchers
Note: G = Games pitched; IP = Innings pitched; W = Wins; L = Losses; ERA = Earned run average; SO = Strikeouts

Other pitchers
Note: G = Games pitched; IP = Innings pitched; W = Wins; L = Losses; ERA = Earned run average; SO = Strikeouts

Relief pitchers
Note: G = Games pitched; W = Wins; L = Losses; SV = Saves; ERA = Earned run average; SO = Strikeouts

League leaders and award winners
 Kimera Bartee: #5 in AL times caught stealing (10)
 Chad Curtis: #5 in AL times caught stealing (10)
 Cecil Fielder: MLB leader in salary ($9,237,500)
 Travis Fryman: AL leader in fielding percentage at third base (.979)
 Travis Fryman: #3 in AL in sacrifice flies (10)
 Travis Fryman: #4 in AL in outs (483)
 Richie Lewis: #2 in AL in wild pitches (14)
 Felipe Lira: #4 in AL in shutouts (2)
 Mike Myers: AL leader in games (83)
 Melvin Nieves: #2 in AL in strikeouts (158)

Worst seasons in Detroit Tigers history

Farm system

LEAGUE CHAMPIONS: JacksonvilleVisalia affiliation shared with Arizona Diamondbacks

See also

 List of worst MLB season records
 1996 in baseball

References

External links
 Baseball-Reference.com 1996 Detroit Tigers

Detroit Tigers seasons
Detroit
Detroit Tigers
1996 in Detroit